Brendan Oliver Maguire (born August 29, 1975) is a Canadian politician, who was elected to the Nova Scotia House of Assembly in the 2013 provincial election. A member of the Nova Scotia Liberal Party, he represents the electoral district of Halifax Atlantic.

Early life
Born in Weymouth, England to parents from Northern Ireland, Maguire and his family emigrated to Canada at four years old. He and his four siblings were abandoned by their parents at the Halifax Shopping Centre shortly after that. As a result, he grew up in foster care in the Halifax area and became a Canadian citizen when he was 16.

Maguire graduated from college with a diploma in computer studies. He worked in telecommunications and later became a sales representative and technician at the Halifax Water Commission.

In 2020 Maguire was named Minister of Municipal Affairs for the province of Nova Scotia.

His political appointments include party whip, deputy speaker, deputy house leader, and critic for Community Services and homelessness.

Brendan is currently the critic of the Department of Health.

Brendan Maguire is currently the longest-sitting member of the Public Accounts Committee.

Brendan sits on the Health Committee.

Political career
Maguire serves on the Public Accounts Committee, the Health Committee, the Law Amendments Committee and is Vice Chair of the Community Services Committee. In 2014, 2015, and 2016, Maguire was named the Best Member of the Provincial Legislature by The Coast magazine. Maguire was also named the 2015 Ambassador of the year by Family SOS.

On February 23, 2021, Maguire was appointed to the Executive Council of Nova Scotia as Minister of Municipal Affairs.

Maguire was re-elected in the 2021 election, however the Rankin Liberals lost government becoming the Official Opposition.

Personal life
Maguire is married with three children. They currently live in Herring Cove, Nova Scotia.

Electoral record

|-
 
|Liberal
|Brendan Maguire
|align="right"| 3,244
|align="right"|42.54 
|align="right"|
|-
 
|New Democratic Party
|Tanis Crosby 
|align="right"|2,564 
|align="right"| 33.63
|align="right"|
|-
 
|Progressive Conservative
|Ryan Brennan
|align="right"|1,817
|align="right"|23.83
|align="right"|
|}

References

External links

Living people
Nova Scotia Liberal Party MLAs
Members of the Executive Council of Nova Scotia
People from the Halifax Regional Municipality
1975 births
English emigrants to Canada
21st-century Canadian politicians